Winnebago County is a county in the U.S. state of Iowa. As of the 2020 census, the population was 10,679. The county seat is Forest City. The county was founded in 1847 and named after the Native American tribe. It is the location of the motor homes manufacturer Winnebago Industries.

Geography
It is Iowa's fifth-smallest county by land area and second-smallest by total area.

Adjacent counties
Faribault County, Minnesota  (northwest)
Freeborn County, Minnesota  (northeast)
Worth County  (east)
Hancock County  (south)
Kossuth County  (west)
Cerro Gordo County  (southeast)

Transportation

Major highways
 U.S. Highway 69
 Iowa Highway 9

Airport
Forest City Municipal Airport

Demographics

2020 census
There were 5,077 housing units, of which 4,512 were occupied.

2010 census
There were 5,194 housing units, of which 4,597 were occupied.

2000 census

At the 2000 census there were 11,723 people, 4,749 households, and 3,181 families in the county.  The population density was 29 people per square mile (11/km2).  There were 5,065 housing units at an average density of 13 per square mile (5/km2).  The racial makeup of the county was 97.37% white, 0.18% black or African American, 0.23% Native American, 0.72% Asian, 0.01% Pacific Islander, 1.01% from other races, and 0.49% from two or more races.  2.02% of the population were Hispanic or Latino of any race.
Of the 4,749 households 30.60% had children under the age of 18 living with them, 56.90% were married couples living together, 7.20% had a female householder with no husband present, and 33.00% were non-families. 29.40% of households were one person and 14.70% were one person aged 65 or older.  The average household size was 2.36 and the average family size was 2.91.

The age distribution was 24.10% under the age of 18, 9.80% from 18 to 24, 24.10% from 25 to 44, 23.10% from 45 to 64, and 18.90% 65 or older.  The median age was 40 years. For every 100 females there were 95.50 males.  For every 100 females age 18 and over, there were 92.90 males.

The median household income was $38,381 and the median family income  was $47,306. Males had a median income of $30,720 versus $22,509 for females. The per capita income for the county was $18,494.  About 5.00% of families and 8.40% of the population were below the poverty line, including 11.90% of those under age 18 and 8.20% of those age 65 or over.

History 
"When the first white settlers came into the county, and for some years thereafter, roving bands of Winnebago Indians made their temporary home within the limits of the county. At times there would be as many as one hundred living along the Lime Creek valley or about Coon Grove, and at other times there would be but a mere handful ... During the summer seasons they would cache their cooking utensils, leave their tepees standing and go northward into Minnesota to hunt and trap. At that time the Winnebago agency was located about forty miles north of Forest City." The Winnebago were removed after the Dakota War of 1862.

Initial settlement was in the wooded eastern third of the county, with prairie and marshy areas in the west being settled after 1880. Early teachers in Winnebago County were required to be able to converse in the language of their pupils. Many of the county's pioneers were of Norwegian descent.

The oldest standing structure in the county is Trinity Church, built in 1874.

In 1938, the Winnebago Rural Electric Cooperative was established. The first section of lines was energized on January 3, 1940.

A 1951 movie by the Rural Electrification Administration  featured local residents describing the struggles for adequate phone service in Winnebago County, prior to the federal loan which enabled the Winnebago Cooperative Telephone Association to convert the area to modern dial service.

The Winnebago Industries RV manufacturing company was founded in Forest City in 1958.

The Winnebago Historical Society is located in the Mansion Museum in Forest City.

Communities

Cities
Buffalo Center
Forest City
Lake Mills
Leland
Rake
Scarville
Thompson

Townships

 Buffalo
 Center
 Eden
 Forest
 Grant
 King
 Lincoln
 Linden
 Logan
 Mount Valley
 Newton
 Norway

Population ranking
The population ranking of the following table is based on the 2020 census of Winnebago County.

† county seat

Politics

See also

National Register of Historic Places listings in Winnebago County, Iowa

References

Further reading




External links

Winnebago County website

 
Iowa placenames of Native American origin
1847 establishments in Iowa
Populated places established in 1847